Anthony Peter Macmillan Coxon (1938–2012), better known as Tony Coxon, was a sociologist and pioneer of multidimensional scaling. His fields of research included religion, occupations, social networks and male sexuality. Appointed professor at the age of 35, Coxon later became first director of the ESRC Research Centre and subsequently worked at the Institute for Social and Economic Research of the University of Essex, where he managed the British Household Panel Survey.

Education
Tony Coxon's education began at The King's School, Canterbury and Cheadle Hulme School. Thereafter, he attended the universities of Leeds and Edinburgh.

Career and research
Coxon lectured at the Universities of Leeds, Edinburgh and Cardiff where he specialised in research methods, and subsequently in sexualities and health studies. Thanks to a research scholarship and visits to Harvard and MIT, Coxon became familiar with pre-Internet computing and Artificial Intelligence at an early stage. From Occupational Cognition, he moved on to Multidimensional Scaling and Content Analysis. At 37, Coxon was offered a chair of Sociological Research Methods at Cardiff University, where he soon became Department head. In 1989 he took up the post of Director of the new Interdisciplinary Research Centre of the University of Essex, as the ESRC was then called. Thereafter, from 1997 to 2002, he was Professor of Sociology and Health Studies.

Sundry activities
Tony Coxon was Co-Director of the Institute for Behavioural Research on AIDS, University of Wales College of Medicine, Cardiff, and professor in the Bro Tâf Health Authority. He was a member of the health education subcommittee of the DHSS expert advisory group on health education and AIDS and a member of the Welsh Office Health Education advisory committee, subcommittee on AIDS. He was co-founder with Dr Tom McManus and Dr Peter Davies of the panel study funded by the MRC and DHSS, Project SIGMA (Sociosexual Investigations of Gay Men and Aids) and was principal investigator at the South Wales and Essex sites (1982–2002); consultant and adviser of WHO Special (later, Global) Programme on AIDS (1987–92) and coordinator of the seven nation International Studies of Gay and Bisexual Behaviour and Aids and a member and Chair of the ESRC Steering Group on AIDS. He was also consultant to Barnet, Brent and Harrow, Bro Tâf, South-East London and North Essex Health Authorities’ HIV/AIDS research advisory and Education Units on PSE (Public Sex Environment) and Outreach Project (1996–2002).

Political life 
Coxon was a member of the Committee of 100, and of the National Administrative Council of the Independent Labour Party.

References

British sociologists
2012 deaths
1938 births
Academics of the University of Essex
Alumni of the University of Leeds
Independent Labour Party National Administrative Committee members